The Bouden Cabinet is the current government of Tunisia. It is headed by Najla Bouden, the first female prime minister in Tunisia and the Arab world. The formation was result of ongoing political instability and an economic crisis as a result of the COVID-19 pandemic in Tunisia.

Cabinet members 

The Bouden government consists of the Prime Minister, 24 ministers and 1 secretary of state.

References

See also 

Women in Tunisia
Cabinets established in 2021
2021 establishments in Tunisia
Cabinets of Tunisia
Current governments